Lonely Heart Bandits is a 1950 American drama film directed by George Blair and written by Gene Lewis. The film stars Dorothy Patrick, John Eldredge, Barbra Fuller, Robert Rockwell, Ann Doran and Richard Travis. It was released on August 29, 1950 by Republic Pictures.

Plot
Two con artists join forces and pose as brother and sister. The man then meets rich widows through the personal advertisements sections of newspapers, marries them and both kill the widows for their money.

Cast    
Dorothy Patrick as Louise Curtis
John Eldredge as Tony Morell / Wade Antrim
Barbra Fuller as Laurel Vernon
Robert Rockwell as Police Lt. Carroll
Ann Doran as Nancy Crane
Richard Travis as Aaron Hunt
Dorothy Granger as Duchess Belle
Eric Sinclair as Bobby Crane
Kathleen Freeman as Bertha Martin
Frank Kreig as Cal
Harry Cheshire as Sheriff Polk
William Schallert as Dave Clark
Howard Negley as Elmer Jayson 
John Crawford as Stevedore
Eddie Dunn as Sheriff York
Sammy McKim as Jimmy Ward
Leonard Penn as Detective Stanley

References

External links 
 

1950 films
American drama films
1950 drama films
Republic Pictures films
Films directed by George Blair
American black-and-white films
1950s English-language films
1950s American films